Throughout the James Bond series of films and novels, Q Branch has given Bond a variety of vehicles with which to battle his enemies. Among the most noteworthy gadgets, Bond has been equipped with various vehicles that have numerous modifications to include elaborate weapons and anti-pursuit systems, alternative transportation modes, and various other functions. One car in particular that has been linked to Mr. Bond's collection is the Aston Martin DB5.

This is a list of noteworthy vehicles seen in James Bond, used by either Bond himself, his allies, or his enemies.

Vehicles in films

Cars and trucks

Other road vehicles

Miscellaneous land vehicles

Military land vehicles

Trains

Aircraft

Marine vehicles

Spacecraft and space weapons

Vehicles in books 
This list includes all types of vehicles.
{| class="wikitable sortable"
!Title
!Vehicle
!Owner
!Notes
|-
| rowspan="2" |Casino Royale
|Bentley 4½ Litre
|James Bond
|Fleming does not say what year the car is, although he describes it as "one of the last 4½-litre Bentleys with the supercharger by Amherst Villiers." James Bond bought the car "almost new in 1933 and had kept it in careful storage through the war." Near the end of the novel, he crashes it in France.
|-
|Citroën
|Le Chiffre
|Le Chiffre kidnaps Vesper Lynd from the casino in this car. Fleming describes it as a "beetle-browed Citroën" and later describes its "front-wheel drive and low chassis." This description likely makes it a Traction Avant model.
|-
| rowspan="8" |Live and Let Die
|Boeing 377 Stratocruiser
|BOAC
|007 takes Stratocruiser on his journeys to America.
|-
|Buick limousine
|United States Government
|After his arrival at Idlewild Airport, Halloran picks Bond up in a black Buick limousine.
|-
|1933 Bentley 4½ Litre
|James Bond
|This is Bond's personal car, which he presumably had repaired after the accident in France. Bond drives this from his flat to his Regent's Park office. Unlike in Casino Royale, Fleming lists the car's year explicitly.
|-
|Silver Phantom
|Seaboard Air Line Railroad
|Bond and Solitaire take this train from Pennsylvania Station and get off at Jacksonville. This name represents the real Silver Star.
|-
|Silver Meteor
|Seaboard Air Line Railroad
|After detraining at Jacksonville from the Silver Phantom, Bond and Solitaire take the sister train for the rest of the trip. Unlike the Silver Phantom, which was a name Fleming conceived, the Meteor was a real train. Bond takes this train again in Goldfinger.
|-
|Cord Model 812
|Felix Leiter
|Bond takes the car from Felix Leiter after he is injured and drives it down to the docks to get into the wild shootout with the Robber. Bond notes that the car was "fifteen years old, he reflected, yet still one of the most modern-looking cars in the world." Assuming the book takes place in 1952, this would make the car a 1937.
|-
|Secatur
|Mr Big
|Luxurious black yacht with grey superstructure built in 1947 for a certain millionaire, later acquired by Mr Big who uses it for smuggling gold coins from Jamaica to the USA. 70 foot (21 m) long, powered by twin General Motor Diesels and capable of doing 20 knots. Bond destroys it with the limpet mine killing everyone aboard including Mr Big in the novel's climax.
|-
|Sunbeam-Talbot 90 Coupe
|John Strangways
|Commander Strangways gives this car to Bond.
|-
| rowspan="6" |Moonraker
|1930 Bentley 4½ Litre
|James Bond
|This is James Bond's same car from Casino Royale, although the year has changed from 1933 to 1930. It is unclear whether this was Fleming's intention or was written in err. After Bond crashes it near the end of the novel, he says that it has "gone to its grave in a Maidstone garage."
|-
|Moonraker
|Sir Hugo Drax
|A prototype nuclear intercontinental ballistic missile used for an attempt of destruction of London.
|-
|Mercedes-Benz 300S
|Hugo Drax
|Used in car chase to Dover
|-
|Alfa Romeo Supercharged Straight-8
|RAF officer
|Passes Bond during the car chase with Drax. Bond guesses the car is a 1932 or 1933, and says the owner is probably a "hot-rod type from one of the RAF stations round here." Drax pushes the car off the road, killing the driver.
|-
|AEC Mammoth Major newsprint lorry
|Bowater
|In the A20 car chase, Hugo Drax pulls his Mercedes-Benz 300S alongside this lorry. Krebs climbs onto it and cuts the ties securing the rolls of newsprint. They roll into the road, causing Bond to crash his 4½-Litre Bentley and thus ending the chase.
|-
|Bentley Mark VI
|James Bond
|Made in 1953, Bond purchases his second Bentley towards the end of the novel, Moonraker. Like his previous Bentley, the Mark VI is grey with dark blue leather upholstery. After Moonraker this model is never mentioned again. Fleming describes it as having and "open touring body." Bentley built the last Mark IVs in 1952, which makes Fleming's choice of 1953 ambiguous. Either he gave this year mistakenly or possibly referred to the car's coachwork, which could have been built that year.
|-
| rowspan="4" |Diamonds Are Forever
|Studillac
|Felix Leiter
|A custom black Studebaker convertible with a Cadillac engine, plus special transmission, brakes and rear axle, owned by Felix Leiter in the novel Diamonds Are Forever. The combination of the aerodynamic Raymond Loewy-designed body with the powerful Cadillac engine made it into a remarkable sports car. Studillacs were not fictional, but actually built by a Long Island, NY company called Bill Frick Motors from 1953 Studebaker Starlight bodies.
|-
|Lockheed G Super Constellation
|TWA
|This is the plane that takes Bond and Tiffany from LA via Chicago to NYC
|-
|RMS Queen Elizabeth
|Cunard Line
|Liner that takes Bond and Tiffany across the Atlantic
|-
|English Electric Canberra
|RAF
|This is the plane that takes Bond to Sierra Leone
|-
| rowspan="4" |From Russia, With Love
|Ilyushin Il-12
|N/A
|This is the plane that takes Red Grant from Crimea to Moscow
|-
|Rolls-Royce Silver Ghost
|Kerim Bey
|Bond is picked up with this car at Yesilkoy airport. Fleming describes the car as "an old black basketwork Rolls-Royce coupé-de-ville that Bond guessed must have been built for some millionaire of the '20s."
|-
|Vickers Viscount
|British European Airways
|Bond's takes the "10.30 BEA Flight 130 to Rome, Athens, and Istanbul."
|-
|Orient Express
|Compagnie Internationale des Wagons-Lits
|
|-
| rowspan="3" |Dr No
|Rolls-Royce Silver Wraith
|M
|Drives M to MI6 headquarters. Described as "the old black Silver Wraith Rolls with the nondescript number-plate."
|-
|Lockheed L-1049 Super Constellation
|N/A
|This is the plane that takes Bond to Jamaica
|-
|The "Dragon"
|Dr No
|Dr No describes the vehicle as a "marsh buggy–the vehicle that is used for oil prospecting." Bond says that the wheels "with their vast smooth rubber tyres, were nearly twice as tall as himself," and "a long metal dragon's head had been added to the front of the radiator and the headlamps had been given black centres to make 'eyes'. That was all there was to it, except that the cabin had been covered with an armoured dome and the flame-thrower added."
|-
| rowspan="6" |Goldfinger
|Aston Martin DB Mark III
|MI6
|
|-
|Rolls-Royce Silver Ghost
|Auric Goldfinger
|Goldfinger uses it to smuggle gold.
|-
|Triumph TR3
|Tilly Masterton
|Masterton uses it to pursue Goldfinger across France. Bond later rams this car with his Aston Martin.
|-
|Bristol Freighter
|N/A
|Transports Goldfinger's Rolls-Royce to France
|-
|Beechcraft Model 18
|Goldfinger
|Goldfinger uses this plane for air surveillance of Fort Knox
|-
|Boeing 377 Stratocruiser
|Auric Goldfinger
|In Goldfinger the final battle is set on-board this plane.
|-
| rowspan="2" |"From a View to a Kill"
|Peugeot 403
|Marie Ann Russell
|Bond uses Marie Ann Russell's car while on assignment in France.
|-
|BSA M20
|SHAPE, Bond, Soviet agent
|Serves a major role in the plot as Bond disguises himself as a despatch rider in order to get close to the enemy spy
|-
| rowspan="3" |"For Your Eyes Only"
|Ford Consul
|Major Gonzales
|The trio uses a stolen car to get from Havelock's estate to Port Antonio
|-
|Chris Craft Constellation
|Major Gonzales and his henchmen
|Described as a glittering 50 ton Chris Craft, it is used by the Gonzales and his men to sail from Jamaica to Cuba after murdering Havelocks. Judging by the weight spec mentioned in the story it is probably the Constellation model
|-
|de Havilland Comet
|N/A
|Bond takes this plane to Canada instead of old Stratocruiser
|-
|"Quantum of Solace"
|
|
|
|-
|"Risico"
|Colombina
|Enrico Colombo
|200 tons former fishing vessel with a sail Colombo uses for his smuggling operations in the Adriatic. Its battle with Kristatos's ship is the novel's climax.
|-
| rowspan="2" |"The Hildebrand Rarity"
|Wavekrest
|Milton Krest
|Luxurious white yacht owned by a rude American millionaire Krest who uses it for his voyages around the world as well as for his hunt of rare fish specimens for his foundation. Built by Bronson Shipbuilding Corporation and designed by Rosenblatts. Specifications: Length 100 ft (30,48 m), Width 21 ft (6,4 m), Weight 200 t, Two 500 horsepower Superior diesel engines, double propellers, top speed 14 knots. As Bond remarks after seeing it: "It was a real ship, built to cruise the world and not just Florida Keys."
|-
|SS Kampala
|British India Steam Navigation Company
|The ship that took Bond to Seychelles and the one he was waiting for to return him to Mombasa at the beginning of the story.
|-
| rowspan="7" |Thunderball
|Ford Consul
|Felix Leiter
|Leiter rents this car for the purpose of his mission
|-
|Humber Super Snipe Series II
|
|Bond and Leiter take a brief tour in a car that belongs to the governor of the Bahamas.
|-
|Bentley Mark II Continental
|James Bond
|A Bentley Mark II Continental was featured in the novel Thunderball and is Bond's final Bentley. Bond, having purchased the car in a wrecked state, upgrades the engine from a 4.5 L engine to a 4.9 L and has a custom drophead body from Mulliners. The Mark II was also grey; however, the interior was black leather. The Mark II Continental is last seen in the novel On Her Majesty's Secret Service where Bond upgrades the vehicles once again with an Arnott supercharger controlled by a magnetic clutch, causing Rolls-Royce, worried about potential damage to the engine, to disown the car. He uses the car in a race with the Contessa Teresa di Vicenzo in her Lancia Flaminia Spyder towards the beginning of the book. Bond dubs the car "the locomotive".
|-
|Disco Volante
|Emilio Largo/SPECTRE
|Hydrofoil white and dark blue yacht, purchased with SPECTRE funds for 200.000 pounds and used for the purposes of operation Omega by Emilio Largo. Built by Cantieri Navali Rodriquez from Messina. specifications: weight 100 t, powered by two Daimler-Benz four-stroke Diesels supercharged by twin Brown-Boveri turbo superchargers, top speed about 50 knots, equipped with Decca Navigator System. The yacht's hull has a hidden hatch like Olterra which is used to smuggle atomic bombs on board.
|-
|U.S. submarine Manta
|United States Navy
|U.S. nuclear George Washington-class submarine used by Bond and Leiter in their pursuit after Disco Volante.
|-
|Underwater chariot
|SPECTRE
|Used for transporting the bombs from the underwater cave to Disco Volante.
|-
|Grumman Amphibian
|Bond and Leiter
|The two use this plane in search of a missing bomber.
|-
| rowspan="3" |The Spy Who Loved Me
|Vespa 150-cc Gran Sport
|Vivienne Michel
|Vivienne Michel buys her Vespa in Hammersmith and has it shipped to Canada. She drives it from Montreal to Florida.
|-
|Sedan
|
|The only description of this car is that it is a "black sedan." "Sluggsy" Morant and Sol "Horror" Horowitz drive this car to the motel.
|-
|Ford Thunderbird
|Rental
|Bond rents this car for the purpose of getting from Toronto to Washington.
|-
| rowspan="6" |On Her Majesty's Secret Service
|Mercedes-Benz W112 saloon
|Blofeld's henchmen
|Upon arriving in Switzerland Bond is picked up with this car. Later they use it to pursue Bond and Tracy.
|-
|Lancia Flaminia Zagato Spyder
|Tracy Draco
|With her white model she overtakes, then races Bond in his Bentley near Royale-les-Eaux.
|-
|Peugeot 403
|
|Bond is picked up by one of Draco's men, who takes him to the helicopter hideout with this car.
|-
|Simca Aronde
|
|Bond rents this car to follow Tracy without being noticed.
|-
|Sud Aviation Caravelle
|Swissair
|This is the plane that takes Bond from London to Zurich.
|-
|Aerospatiale Alouette III
|SPECTRE
|This is the helicopter that takes Bond to Piz Gloria.
|-
| rowspan="2" |You Only Live Twice
|Douglas DC-8
|Japan Airlines
|This is the plane that takes Bond to Tokyo.
|-
|Toyopet saloon
|Dikko Henderson
|Henderson picks up Bond at the airport in this car.
|-
| rowspan="3" |The Man with the Golden Gun
|Rolls-Royce Phantom
|M
|Referred to as "old, black Phantom Rolls", it takes M to SIS Headquarters after his lunch at Blades.
|-
|Ford Thunderbird
|Francisco Scaramanga
|Bond follows this car to Thunderbird hotel
|-
|Chris Craft Roamer
|Francisco Scaramanga
|A 40-foot (12 m) boat that Scaramanga intends to use for deep-sea fishing to entertain his mobster guests.
|-
|"Octopussy"
| colspan="3" |no vehicles
|-
|"The Living Daylights"
|Opel Kapitän
|MI6 agent
|Uses car's engine noise to cover up Bond's shooting.
|-
|"The Property of a Lady"
|
|
|
|-
|"007 in New York"
|
|
|
|-
|Licence Renewed
|Saab 900
|James Bond
|Bond's personal car, aka The Silver Beast
|-
|The Man from Barbarossa
|Saab 900
|James Bond
|
|-

|Never Send Flowers
|Saab 900
|James Bond
|
|-

|SeaFire
|Saab 900
|James Bond
|
|-

|Nobody Lives for Ever
|Saab 9000
|
|Rented by Bond
|-

|No Deals, Mr. Bond
|Saab 9000
|
|Rented by Bond
|
}

Vehicles in video games
This list includes all types of vehicles that are either playable and driven by the player in the video games or not playable and act as enemy vehicles or only appear in cutscenes. Some vehicles that are not playable are sometimes ridden by the player required to shoot down enemy vehicles in a few games.

Playable vehicles

Exhibitions
In 2012 the National Motor Museum hosted Bond in Motion, an exhibition of 50 Bond cars to celebrate fifty years of Bond on film. In 2014, the exhibition moved to the London Film Museum, cars from Spectre were added in 2015.

See also
 List of James Bond gadgets
 Amphibious automobile
 Flying car
 Outline of James Bond
 James Bond Car Collection

References
Inline

General

 
 Greatest James Bond Films list of Vehicles, Gadgets, Love-making, etc., retrieved on January 5, 2008.
 Bond in Motion at The National Motor Museum
 James Bond 007 "The Films and the Vehicles" page supplied by BMW AG, retrieved on January 5, 2008.
 IMCDb.org - Internet Movie Cars Database
 The Complete Guide To James Bond's Cars (Video) November 30, 2011
 Topgear, 50 years of Bond cars
 Collection of James Bond Cars

External links 
 James Bond Marine Vehicles Infographic

James Bond
Vehicles
James Bond